Matthew Bondswell (born 18 April 2002) is an English footballer who plays as a left-back for Newcastle United.

Club career
After spending time in the academy of Nottingham Forest, Bondswell joined the academy of Bundesliga side RB Leipzig in the summer of 2018.

On 21 August 2020, Bondswell joined Eerste Divisie side FC Dordrecht on a season-long loan deal. On 30 August 2020, he made his professional debut, playing the full match in a 0-0 draw with Go Ahead Eagles. On 15 January 2021, it was announced that his loan at Dordrecht had been terminated.

On 19 March 2021, a month after leaving Leipzig, Bondswell signed with Newcastle United, initially joining the club's under-23 squad.

On 31 January 2022, Bondswell joined League One club Shrewsbury Town on loan until the end of the season. On 28 March 2022, Bondswell was recalled by Newcastle United as he was unable to make his EFL debut for Shrewsbury Town, featuring as an unused substitute in 11 consecutive league matches.

International career
Bondswell has so far represented England up to under-18 level and also competed with the under-17 side the 2019 UEFA European Under-17 Championship in the Republic of Ireland.

Career statistics

Club

Notes

References

2002 births
Living people
English footballers
England youth international footballers
English expatriate footballers
Association football defenders
Nottingham Forest F.C. players
RB Leipzig players
FC Dordrecht players
Newcastle United F.C. players
Shrewsbury Town F.C. players
Eerste Divisie players
English expatriate sportspeople in Germany
Expatriate footballers in Germany
English expatriate sportspeople in the Netherlands
Expatriate footballers in the Netherlands
Footballers from Nottingham
Black British sportsmen